Oregon Iron Works may refer to:

Oregon Iron Works, a company founded in 1944 and located in Clackamas, Oregon, United States
Oregon Iron Works, a colloquial name for the Oregon Iron Company, which operated from 1865 to 1928 in Oswego, Oregon, United States
Oregon Iron Works (Albina), an American company from Albina, Oregon, that built steamships among other products